Seth Wayne Elledge (born May 20, 1996) is an American professional baseball pitcher for the Atlanta Braves of Major League Baseball (MLB). He previously played for the St. Louis Cardinals. He was drafted by the Seattle Mariners in the fourth round of the 2017 Major League Baseball draft and made his MLB debut for the Cardinals in 2020.

Amateur career
Elledge attended Centennial High School in Frisco, Texas. As a senior, he compiled a 2.92 ERA. Undrafted out of high school in the 2014 Major League Baseball draft, he enrolled at Dallas Baptist University where he played college baseball. In 2016, he played collegiate summer baseball with the Falmouth Commodores of the Cape Cod Baseball League. In 2017, as a junior at Dallas Baptist, he was 2–1 with 2.59 ERA and 13 saves in 22 relief appearances.

Professional career

Seattle Mariners
After Elledge's junior year, he was selected by the Seattle Mariners in the fourth round of the 2017 Major League Baseball draft.

Elledge signed with Seattle and made his professional debut with the Everett AquaSox of the Class A Short Season Northwest League before being promoted to the Clinton LumberKings of the Class A Midwest League. In 19 relief appearances between the two teams, he compiled a 3–0 record with a 3.24 ERA. He began the 2018 season with the Modesto Nuts of the Class A-Advanced California League, and was named a California League All-Star.

St. Louis Cardinals
On July 27, 2018, Elledge was traded to the St. Louis Cardinals in exchange for Sam Tuivailala. He was assigned to the Springfield Cardinals of the Class AA Texas League and finished the season there. In 44 total relief appearances between Modesto and Springfield, he posted an 8–2 record with a 2.13 ERA, a 0.95 WHIP, and 13 saves. Elledge began 2019 back with Springfield and was promoted to the Memphis Redbirds of the Class AAA Pacific Coast League in June. Over  relief innings pitched between the two clubs, he went 6–4 with a 4.26 ERA, striking out 75. He was selected to play in the Arizona Fall League for the Glendale Desert Dogs following the season and earned All-Star honors.

On August 15, 2020, Elledge was promoted to the major leagues. He made his major league debut on August 16 against the Chicago White Sox. Over  innings pitched with St. Louis, he went 1–0 with a 4.63 ERA and 14 strikeouts.

For the 2021 season, Elledge pitched  innings in which he gave up six runs and struck out 11 batters for the Cardinals. He spent a majority of the season with Memphis, going 2–2 with a 6.56 ERA and 46 strikeouts over  innings. On October 6, 2021, the Cardinals designated him for assignment and he was outrighted to Memphis the following day. He was released on March 25, 2022.

Atlanta Braves
On March 28, 2022, Elledge signed a minor league contract with the Atlanta Braves organization. Elledge made 43 appearances for the Triple-A Gwinnett Stripers, recording a 1-5 record and 3.88 ERA with 63 strikeouts and 3 saves in 46.1 innings pitched.

On November 10, 2022, Elledge was selected to the 40-man roster. He was optioned to Triple-A Gwinnett to begin the 2023 season.

References

External links

Dallas Baptist Patriots bio

1996 births
Living people
People from Frisco, Texas
Baseball players from Texas
Major League Baseball pitchers
St. Louis Cardinals players
Dallas Baptist Patriots baseball players
Falmouth Commodores players
Everett AquaSox players
Clinton LumberKings players
Modesto Nuts players
Springfield Cardinals players
Memphis Redbirds players
Glendale Desert Dogs players